Elizabeth White may refer to

Elizabeth Coleman White (1871–1954), New Jersey agricultural specialist
Liz White (actress) (born 1979), English actress
Liz White (activist) (born c. 1950), Canadian animal rights activist
Elizabeth Shearer White (fl. 1946–1993), independent American film producer, founder of the Shearer Summer Theatre in Martha's Vineyard
Polingaysi Qöyawayma (1892–1990), also known as Elizabeth Q. White, Hopi educator, writer, and potter
Elizabeth Wade White (1906–1994), American author, poet, and activist